Kam in Iran may refer to:
 Kam, Mazandaran (كام - Kām)
 Kam, West Azerbaijan (كم - Kam)